Squarespace, Inc. is an American website building and hosting company which is based in New York City, US. It provides software as a service for website building and hosting, and allows users to use pre-built website templates and drag-and-drop elements to create and modify webpages.

In 2003, Anthony Casalena founded Squarespace as a blog hosting service while attending the University of Maryland, College Park. He was its only employee until 2006 when it reached $1 million in revenue. The company grew from 30 employees in 2010 to 550 by 2015. By 2014, it raised a total of $78.5 million in venture capital; added e-commerce tools, domain name services, and analytics; and replaced its coding backend with drag-and-drop features. It began trading on the New York Stock Exchange on May 19, 2021. According to W3Techs, Squarespace is used by 1.9% of the top 10 million websites.

Company history
Casalena began developing Squarespace for his personal use while attending the University of Maryland. He started sharing it with friends and family members and participated in a "business incubator" program at the university. In January 2004, he launched Squarespace as do it yourself/drag and drop website builder for the public, with a $30,000 seed fund from his father, a small grant from the university, and 300 beta testers who paid a discounted rate. At that time, Casalena was the company's sole developer and employee, and worked out of his dorm room.

By the time Casalena graduated in 2007, Squarespace was making annual revenues of $1 million. He moved to New York City, began hiring, and had 30 employees by 2010. That year, Squarespace received $38.5 million in its first round of venture capital funding led by Index Ventures and Accel Partners, enabling it to hire more staff, continue to develop its software, and double its marketing budget. From 2009 to 2012, it grew an average of 266% in yearly revenue. In April 2014, it received another $40 million in funding. By 2015, it had reached $100 million in revenue and 550 employees.

Squarespace purchased Super Bowl advertising spots in 2014, 2015, 2016, 2017 and 2018. Its 2017 ad won an Emmy Award for Outstanding Commercial. In 2017, it signed a sponsorship deal with the New York Knicks to add the Squarespace logo to their uniforms.

After the Unite the Right rally in 2017, Squarespace received a petition with 58,000 signatures and removed a group of websites for violating its terms of service against "bigotry or hatred" towards demographic groups. In 2017, it raised an additional $200 million in funding, boosting its value to $1.7 billion. This funding was earmarked for reacquiring interests from investors.

In 2018, Squarespace partnered with the Madison Square Garden Company to launch the "Make It Awards", which awarded $30,000 to entrepreneurs (4 winners, totaling $120,000).

Squarespace acquired appointment scheduling company Acuity Scheduling in April 2019, followed by the acquisition of Unfold, an app allowing users to editorialize their social media content, in October 2019. In April 2021, the company bought hospitality industry management platform Tock for more than $400 million.

In early 2021, the company filed paperwork with the U.S. Securities and Exchange Commission (SEC) to go public through direct listing on the NYSE under the symbol SQSP. In March 2021, Squarespace raised $300 million in a round of funding led by Dragoneer, Tiger Global, D1 Capital Partners and Fidelity Management & Research Company with participation from existing investors. This funding round valued the company at $10 billion.

Corporate affairs

Leadership 
Squarespace is managed by CEO and Founder Anthony Casalena. Other key executives are:

 Courtenay O'Connor, General Counsel
 David Lee, Chief Creative Officer 
 John Colton, Senior Vice President, Engineering 
 Kinjil Mathur, Chief Marketing Officer 
 Nathan Gooden, Chief Financial Officer 
 Mary Good, Chief People Officer 
 Paul Gubbay, Chief Product Officer 
 Raphael Fontes, Senior Vice President, Customer Operations 
 Roberta Meo, Vice President, Channels and Services
 Dan Chandre, Vice President, Head of Acuity Scheduling & Squarespace Payments
 Matthew Tucker, Senior Vice President, Head of Tock

Product / business model
As of November 2022, Squarespace had more than four million subscriptions. Its users employ pre-built website templates, and a variety of drag and drop widgets to add elements such as text and images. Its developers also create custom templates that are sold to users. On-screen instructions walk users through things like search engine optimization and setting up e-commerce. Its services are in direct competition with WordPress.com, Wix.com, Webflow.com and other digital website building agencies.

Squarespace was initially built for creating and hosting blogs. E-commerce features, such as an integration with Stripe for accepting credit card payments, were added in 2013. In 2014, more commerce features were added; a mobile version of the service was released; a separate facility was added for developers writing custom templates and features; and a logo-creation app was introduced in partnership with icon designer Noun Project.

In 2011, Squarespace was upgraded to version 6, with new templates, a grid-based user interface, and other enhancements. Version 7, which went live in 2014, replaced its coding backend with a drag and drop interface, and added integration with Google Workspace (formerly G Suite and Google Apps for Work) and Getty Images. In 2016, Squarespace started selling domains, putting it in more direct competition with GoDaddy; and added an analytics dashboard and PayPal integration.

References

External links

Blog hosting services
Cloud platforms
Companies based in Manhattan
Internet properties established in 2004
Companies listed on the New York Stock Exchange
Direct stock offerings
Publicly traded companies based in New York City
YouTube sponsors